The Grundrisse der Kritik der Politischen Ökonomie (Foundations of a Critique of Political Economy) is an unfinished manuscript by the German philosopher Karl Marx. The series of seven notebooks was rough-drafted by Marx, chiefly for purposes of self-clarification, during the winter of 1857–8. Left aside by Marx in 1858, it remained unpublished until 1939.

Contents
The Grundrisse is very wide-ranging in subject matter and covers all six sections of Marx's critique of political economy (of which only one, the first volume of Das Kapital, ever reached a final form). It is often described as the rough draft of Das Kapital, although there is considerable disagreement about the exact relationship between the two texts, particularly around the issue of methodology.

Due to its breadth and its incorporation of themes from Marx's earlier writings, the Grundrisse is central to Marx's body of work. Its subject matter includes the prices of production, relations of production, distribution, exchange, alienation, value, labor, capitalism, the rise of technology and automation, pre-capitalist forms of social organization, and the preconditions for a communist revolution. Scholars have noted major differences between the Marx's earlier writings, such as The German Ideology and The Communist Manifesto, and the later ones, Das Kapital and Grundrisse, suggesting that Marx's views evolved, though the main themes remained the same.

As Martin Nicolaus and others have argued, the Grundrisse is crucial for understanding Marx's mature analysis of capitalism, even though, historically, it has been far less influential in the development of the various strands of Marxist theory than earlier texts such as the Communist Manifesto, the Economic and Philosophic Manuscripts of 1844, and The German Ideology.  Towards the end of his life, Marx, according to Nicolaus, viewed the latter “with a scepticism bordering on rejection.”  The Grundrisse, on the other hand, was one of the few texts which Marx spoke of “with a tone of achievement and a sense of accomplishment.” If this is true, possibly the main reason is that the more substantive first part of The German Ideology was largely written by Friedrich Engels while the subsequent parts, satirizing the linguistic apostasies and word-mongering of Left-Hegelian philosophers, were written by Marx himself.

French philosopher Louis Althusser believed that Marx's thought had been misunderstood and underestimated. He condemned various interpretations of Marx—such as historicism, idealism, economism—on the grounds that they fail to realise that Marx's "science of history", historical materialism, represents a revolutionary view of social change. Althusser believed these errors to result from the notion (mistaken in his view) that Marx's entire body of work forms a coherent whole. Althusser proffered a radical "epistemological break" in Marx's thought, which can be seen by comparing the unpublished Grundrisse and Das Kapital.

Dissemination
Grundrisse became available in different languages over a period of time. 
 1939–41 First German edition Marx–Engels Institute, Moscow 
 1953 Second German edition , GDR
 1958–65 Japanese translation
 1962–78 Chinese translation
 1967–68 French translation Roger Dangeville (International Communist Party)
 1968–69 Russian translation
 1968–70 Italian translation
 1970–71 Spanish translation
 1971 Swedish translation
 1971–77 Czech translation
1972 Hungarian translation
1972–74 Romanian translation
1973 English translation
1974–75 Slovak translation
1974–78 Danish translation
1979 Serbian/Serbo-Croatian translation
1979 Turkish translation
1985 Slovenian translation
1985–87 Persian translation
1986 Polish translation
1986 Finnish translation
1989–92 Greek translation
2000 Korean translation
2008 Portuguese translation.

==The Grundrisse'''s influence==
The translation of the Grundrisse into English in 1973 had a profound effect on the then-emerging field of cultural studies. Stuart Hall, at that time the director of the Centre for Contemporary Cultural Studies at the University of Birmingham, led several seminars on Marx's introduction to the Grundrisse, particularly "The method of political economy." These seminars culminated in the publication of a working paper titled “Marx’s Notes on Method: A ‘Reading’ of the ‘1857 Introduction.’” According to Greg Wise, in that working paper, Hall lays the groundwork for theories of overdetermination and articulation, both of which would be used in a study of mugging in the United Kingdom, Policing the Crisis.

Footnotes

Further reading

 Bottomore, Tom, ed. A Dictionary of Marxist Thought. Oxford: Blackwell, 1998.
Choat, Simon. Marx's 'Grundrisse': A reader's guide. London, U.K. : Bloomsbury Academic. 240p. (Reader's Guides) 
 Elliott, John E., Marx's Grundrisse: Vision of capitalism's creative destruction. Journal of Post-Keynesian Economics. Winter 1978-79, Vol. 1, No. 2, pp. 148-169.
 Harvey, David. The Limits of Capital. London: Verso, 2006.
 Lallier, Adalbert G. The Economics of Marx’s Grundrisse: an Annotated Summary. New York: St. Martin's Press, 1989.
 Mandel, Ernest. The Formation of the Economic Thought of Karl Marx: 1843 to Capital. London: Verso, 2015.
 Mandel, Ernest. Marxist Economic Theory. New York: Monthly Review Press, 1970.
 Negri, Antonio. Marx Beyond Marx: Lessons on the Grundrisse. Brooklyn: Autonomedia, 1989.
 Postone, Moishe. Time, Labor, and Social Domination: A Reinterpretation of Marx's Critical Theory. Cambridge [England]: Cambridge University Press, 1993.
 Roman Rosdolsky. The Making of Marx's Capital. London: Pluto Press, 1977.
 Tronti, Mario. Workers and Capital. London: Verso, 2019.
 Uchida, Hiroshi. Marx's Grundrisse and Hegel's Logic. Terrell Carber, ed. London: Routledge, 2015.

 See also 

 Unto This Last''

External links

 Complete text (English html format), Marxists Internet Archive, www.marxists.org/

1941 non-fiction books
Books by Karl Marx
Philosophy books
Unfinished books
Critique of political economy
Marxian critique of political economy